Kobyashi Naru is a 1987 adventure game by Mastertronic. The title comes from the Kobayashi Maru scenario in the Star Trek fictional universe, a training test. The player attempts to complete a series of challenges in order to complete the Kobyashi Naru test. Gameplay is standard for text-based adventures of the era. ZZap!64 summed it up as "harmless claptrap", while CVG Magazine commented on the "extremeley basic" graphics. Computer Gamer praised the intuitiveness of the game's parser, as opposed to other games that require a persnickety combination of words.

References

External links
 
 Tilt review
 Happy Computer review
 

1980s interactive fiction
1987 video games
Adventure games
Amstrad CPC games
Commodore 64 games
Mastertronic games
Science fiction video games
Single-player video games
Video games based on Star Trek
Video games developed in the United Kingdom
ZX Spectrum games